Stepping Stone Inter College founded in April 2000, is an educational institution located in Gorakhpur. Affiliated from the Council for the Indian School Certificate Examinations (CISCE), the school has classes for students up to 12th standard and follows the curriculum prescribed by CISCE.

It was established by Mr Raghunath Das Gupta and Mrs. Apneet Gupta. The first class took place on 17 April 2000. Currently they have three branches: Surajkund branch, Green City Branch and Maniram Branch. All the branches are currently limited to Gorakhpur region only. 

Green City Branch and Maniram branch are affiliated to Central Board of Secondary Education (CBSE).

References

Education in Gorakhpur
Educational institutions established in 2000
2000 establishments in Uttar Pradesh
Intermediate colleges in Uttar Pradesh